Carl August Verner Kronlund (25 August 1865 – 15 August 1937) was a Swedish curler who won a silver medal at the 1924 Winter Olympics. Aged 58, he was the oldest competitor at those Games and the oldest competitor ever in the modern era Winter Olympics. For the 1924 winter games, he played lead right-handed for the second Swedish team.

He lived most of his life in Stockholm with his wife Elin. He was a chimney sweeper for much of his working life. 

He died at the age of 71 in Stockholm of a stroke. Part of his family emigrated to the United States; his great-granddaughter grew up in the United States and is a dermatologist in Plano, Texas, Karen Lund.

References

1865 births
1937 deaths
Swedish male curlers
Olympic curlers of Sweden
Olympic silver medalists for Sweden
Curlers at the 1924 Winter Olympics
Medalists at the 1924 Winter Olympics